George Rupuha Skudder (10 February 1948 – 8 May 2021) was a New Zealand rugby union player. A wing three-quarter, Skudder represented Waikato at a provincial level, and was a member of the New Zealand national side, the All Blacks, from 1969 to 1973. He played 14 matches for the All Blacks including one international, against the touring Welsh side in 1969.

Skudder died on 8 May 2021, aged 73. He was the uncle of All Blacks Nehe Milner-Skudder, Ben Atiga, and Tanerau Latimer.

References

1948 births
2021 deaths
New Zealand sportspeople of Tongan descent
People from Te Puke
People educated at Te Aute College
University of Waikato alumni
New Zealand rugby union players
New Zealand international rugby union players
Waikato rugby union players
Māori All Blacks players
Rugby union wings
Rugby union players from the Bay of Plenty Region